The Tour de l'Aude Cycliste Féminin was the longest running UCI event on the women's elite cycle racing calendar. It had been held annually in the Aude region of south-central France since 1985 until its cancellation after the 2010 edition. The race began when Jean Thomas, who organized men's events, turned to a major women's tour. The initial race was four days long around one city. The race grew in length and prestige until it attracted many of the top riders in the world.  By 2006, the race was 10 days long. Following Thomas' death, the race was organized by his daughter, Anne-Marie Thomas.  However, after the 2010 race, a lack of sponsorship led to the race's cancellation.

Leaders' jerseys
Race leaders in 6 different categories receive colored jerseys to wear while racing.  Jerseys are awarded at the completion of each stage and are worn until a new racer is awarded the jersey. The colors for the different competition leaders are as follows:

 General classification leader
 Points classification leader
 Mountains classification leader 
 Under-23 rider classification leader
 Sprints classification leader
 Stage-winner's jersey

Winners

External links

References

 
Cycle races in France
Recurring sporting events established in 1985
1985 establishments in France
Women's road bicycle races